Schistura kohchangensis is a species of ray-finned fish, a stone loach, in the genus Schistura. It is found in moderately to fast flowing streams with gravel to stone substrates in eastern Thailand and Cambodia.

References

K
Cyprinid fish of Asia
Fish of Southeast Asia
Fish of Thailand
Freshwater fish of Asia
Fish described in 1933